Linlithgo Reformed Church of Livingston is a historic Dutch Reformed church at 447 Church Road in Livingston, Columbia County, New York.  It was built in 1854 and is a two-story brick building with a medium pitched gable roof, deep bracketed cornice, and semi-engaged tower in the center bay of the front facade in the Italianate style.  The adjacent cemetery contains several hundred burials dating from about 1814 to the present.

It was listed on the National Register of Historic Places in 2006.

References

Reformed Church in America churches in New York (state)
Churches on the National Register of Historic Places in New York (state)
Italianate architecture in New York (state)
Churches completed in 1854
19th-century Reformed Church in America church buildings
Churches in Columbia County, New York
National Register of Historic Places in Columbia County, New York
1854 establishments in New York (state)
Italianate church buildings in the United States